Herbert Hein (born 27 March 1954) is a retired German football player. He spent 12 seasons in the Bundesliga with 1. FC Köln and Borussia Dortmund.

Honours 
 Bundesliga champion: 1977–78
 Bundesliga runner-up: 1972–73
 DFB-Pokal winner: 1976–77, 1977–78
 DFB-Pokal finalist: 1972–73

References

External links 
 

1954 births
Living people
German footballers
1. FC Köln players
Borussia Dortmund players
Tennis Borussia Berlin players
Bundesliga players
Association football defenders